Elizabeth Steiner (born April 5, 1963) is a Democratic member of the Oregon Senate, representing the 17th District. Steiner was appointed to the Senate in 2011 by commissioners from Multnomah and Washington counties following the resignation of her predecessor, Suzanne Bonamici.

Career and family 
Steiner is an Adjunct Associate Professor of Family Medicine at Oregon Health & Science University (OHSU). She is a past President of the Oregon Academy of Family Physicians. She has three children.

In 2013, Steiner publicly revealed she suffers from major depressive disorder and multiple sclerosis.

References

External links
 Dr. Steiner Hayward's official website
 Dr. Elizabeth Steiner Hayward and Dr. Alan Bates testify before Oregon Medical Board -- OMB Public Meeting audio from 2012-10-12
 Mental Health Debate Personal For One Oregon Lawmaker

Democratic Party Oregon state senators
Living people
People from Multnomah County, Oregon
Oregon Health & Science University faculty
Place of birth missing (living people)
21st-century American politicians
21st-century American women politicians
Physicians from Oregon
1963 births
American women academics